Richard Parkes may refer to:

Richard Parkes (clergyman) (born 1559), English clergyman
Richard Parkes (piper) (born 1960), Northern Irish bagpipe player

See also
Richard Parkes Bonington (1802–1828), English Romantic landscape painter
Richard Parke (1893–1950), American bobsledder
Richard Parks (disambiguation)
Richard Parker (disambiguation)